Alfredo Omar Tena Salamano (born 28 April 1985, in Mexico City) is a Mexican former footballer who played as a midfielder or defender.

He started his career with Club América in 2005 and made three appearances for them in the Clausura 2008 season. He moved to Querétaro for the Apertura 2009 season and he made 6 appearances for them in his first season. In 2011, Alfredo was transferred to 2nd division Italian Side Como.

Career
Born in Mexico City, Tena began playing football with the youth side of Club América. He retired after the 2014 season, playing for Club América.

Tena is the son of Club América player Alfredo Tena.

References

External links

1985 births
Living people
Club América footballers
Querétaro F.C. footballers
Footballers from Mexico City
Association football midfielders
Association football defenders
Mexican footballers